The Mangoky River is a 564-kilometer-long (350 mi) river in Madagascar in the regions of Atsimo-Andrefana and Anosy. 
It is formed by the Mananantanana and the Matsiatra. Another important affluent is the Zomandao River.

It rises in the Central Highlands of Madagascar just east of the city of Fianarantsoa.

Most of Madagascar has undergone serious deforestation during the last 40 years, chiefly from slash-and-burn practises by indigenous peoples. This loss of forest has led to extreme soil erosion in the Mangoky River basin, as evidenced by the many sandbars located within the river channel. Silt-laden, greenish-tan Lake Ihotry is clearly discernible south of the river. Between the lake and the coast is a rather large, whitish area of sand interspersed with silt-laden ponds. The southern portion of the delta is dominated by successive barrier island and spit formation. In contrast, the northern, protected portion of the delta is dominated by tidal passes and mangrove swamps.

Bridge
Works of a Mangoky river bridge on the RN 9 will be shortly undertaken. It will be the longest bridge of Madagascar with 880 m.

See also

List of rivers of Madagascar

References

Rivers of Madagascar
Mozambique Channel
Rivers of Atsimo-Andrefana
Rivers of Anosy